is the 13th single by Japanese singer/songwriter Chisato Moritaka. Written by Moritaka and Kyōhei Tsutsumi, the single was released by Warner Pioneer on June 25, 1991.

Background 
This was Moritaka's first collaboration with Tsutsumi after the success of her 1989 cover of "17-sai", which Tsutsumi originally co-wrote for Saori Minami in 1971. The resulting composition was a kayōkyoku ballad with Canzone Napoletana influences.

The B-side is "Itsumademo", which was used as the ending theme of the 1991 anime TV series Mischievous Twins: The Tales of St. Clare's.

Chart performance 
"Hachigatsu no Koi" peaked at No. 6 on Oricon's singles chart and sold 106,000 copies.

Other versions 
Moritaka re-recorded the song and uploaded the video on her YouTube channel on August 8, 2012. This version is also included in Moritaka's 2013 self-covers DVD album Love Vol. 1.

Track listing 
All lyrics are written by Chisato Moritaka; all music is arranged by Hideo Saitō.

Personnel 
 Chisato Moritaka – vocals
 Hideo Saitō – all instruments, programming, backing vocals

Chart positions

References

External links 
 
 
 

1991 singles
1991 songs
Japanese-language songs
Chisato Moritaka songs
Songs with lyrics by Chisato Moritaka
Songs with music by Kyōhei Tsutsumi
Warner Music Japan singles